Omar Wade (born 15 May 1990) is a Senegalese professional footballer who plays as a forward.

Career
Born in Dakar, Wade trained with the academy of Diambars before signing professional with French club Lille. He made his senior debut for Lille during the 2010–11 season, and moved on loan to Turkish club Boluspor in January 2012. He had further loan spells at Mouscron-Péruwelz and Carquefou during the 2012–13 season. At the end of his Lille contract, he returned to Diambars, where he stayed for two seasons, before signing for SC Feignies in January 2015. He spend the 2015–16 season with JA Drancy, followed by two years in the United Arab Emirates with Al-Arabi.

In January 2019 he signed for Ain Sud Foot. In August 2019 he signed for Gueugnon in Championnat National 3, where he scored 15 goals in 11 appearances before leaving for Annecy in February 2020.

On 7 February 2022, Wade joined Saudi Arabian club Al-Shoulla.

References

External links
 
 

1990 births
Living people
Senegalese footballers
Diambars FC players
Lille OSC players
Boluspor footballers
Royal Excel Mouscron players
USJA Carquefou players
Entente Feignies Aulnoye FC players
JA Drancy players
Al-Arabi SC (UAE) players
Ain Sud players
FC Gueugnon players
FC Annecy players
Al-Shoulla FC players
Ligue 1 players
TFF First League players
Challenger Pro League players
Championnat National players
Championnat National 2 players
Championnat National 3 players
UAE First Division League players
Saudi First Division League players
Association football forwards
Senegalese expatriate footballers
Senegalese expatriate sportspeople in France
Expatriate footballers in France
Senegalese expatriate sportspeople in Turkey
Expatriate footballers in Turkey
Senegalese expatriate sportspeople in Belgium
Expatriate footballers in Belgium
Senegalese expatriate sportspeople in the United Arab Emirates
Expatriate footballers in the United Arab Emirates
Senegalese expatriate sportspeople in Saudi Arabia
Expatriate footballers in Saudi Arabia